Making Tax Digital (MTD) is a UK government initiative that sets out a vision for the 'end of the tax return' and a 'transformed tax system', announced in 2015 and originally intended to be in place by 2020. HM Revenue and Customs (HMRC) states that the main goal of MTD is to make tax administration more effective, more efficient and simpler for taxpayers.

The changes are expected apply to a wide range of taxpayers, including most businesses, micro-businesses, self-employed people and landlords, as well as individual taxpayers. The first mandatory use of digital methods was for Value Added Tax, beginning in April 2019 for many businesses and organisations. Making Tax Digital for Income Tax Self-Assessment (MTD for ITSA) has been delayed until 2026.

Description 
Businesses and individuals (or their agents) will be required to keep digital records of transactions, and send quarterly updates to HMRC. For income tax, the quarterly updates will provide the totals of income and expenses, and an end-of-period statement must be submitted for each tax year. This statement must be submitted by the 31 January following the end of the tax year, and may include accounting adjustments and claims for reliefs or allowances.

Under MTD, taxpayers will send HMRC summaries of their income and expenditure at least four times a year. HMRC says this will enable a more ongoing and accurate projection of tax due, as opposed to the current system of one tax bill at the end of the year. To do this, taxpayers will need to integrate their accounts with software in some way. HMRC's 2017 consultation response stated that spreadsheets can be used if they can meet with HMRC's technical requirements. However, many taxpayers will use more comprehensive accounting software to avoid the complications of linking a spreadsheet to their digital tax account. HMRC is working with accounting software developers to ensure that taxpayers are able to make the switch to digital tax.

Timescale for implementation 
A government paper in March 2017 stated that Value Added Tax (VAT) would become the first tax to move to the digital system in April 2019, but would only be mandatory for businesses and landlords with turnover above the VAT threshold (at that time £85,000). The government had stated in 2015 that 99% of VAT returns were already being made online. MTD was removed from the 2017 Finance Bill ahead of the June general election, leading to speculation that the programme had been dropped. In July the government confirmed the 2019 timetable, and stated that it would be at least two further years before digital records would begin for other taxes.

, the past and future deadlines for the start of mandatory digital filing are as follows.

Exemptions 
For Value Added Tax, VAT Notice 700/22 outlines that claims for exemption from MTD can be made on grounds which include:

 Where it is not practical to use digital tools, for reasons such as age, disability or location
 Where a business is run entirely by practising members of a religious society (or order) whose beliefs are incompatible with using electronic methods.

The same notice allows charities running fundraising events to bundle onto one invoice all supplies received, and the same for all supplies made. An example is given of a church fete run by volunteers.

References

External links 
 Overview of Making Tax Digital – HMRC, updated December 2022
 Using Making Tax Digital for Income Tax – HMRC, updated January 2023

Taxation in the United Kingdom